Larry D. Mann (18 December 1922 – 6 January 2014) was a Canadian actor. He was best known as "The Boss" in a series of Bell Canada television commercials in the 1980s and for voicing the character of Yukon Cornelius in Rudolph the Red-Nosed Reindeer.

Life and career 
Larry D. Mann was born in Toronto, Ontario, on 18 December 1922. Before his acting career, he was a disc jockey on 1050 CHUM radio in Toronto in 1949.

Mann voiced the character of Yukon Cornelius in the classic Rankin-Bass Christmas special  Rudolph the Red-Nosed Reindeer.  He also provided voices for characters in several other Rankin-Bass television series and specials.

Mann's film career spanned four decades. He came to the attention of CBC audiences in 1953 when he kidded around with the puppet Uncle Chichimus on the show Let's See. According to a CBC Archives article, Mann got the job when his friend, actor Don Harron, pointed him out to producer Norman Jewison. Apart from his CBC work, he appeared in more than 20 movies, including In the Heat of the Night, Bullitt, and The Sting.

Mann's many television credits include Get Smart, Gunsmoke, The Man From U.N.C.L.E., Bewitched, Hogan's Heroes, Honey West, The Green Hornet, Green Acres, Columbo, Quincy, M.E. and  Hill Street Blues. He also played the title role in a series of Bell Canada television commercials called "The Boss" for ten years beginning in 1981.

His last role was on Homefront in 1991.

His brother was actor Paul Mann, who appeared in the films America America and Fiddler on the Roof. Larry Mann died of natural causes on 6 January 2014 in Los Angeles. He was 91 years old.

Filmography

Films 
 1958: Flaming Frontier as Bradford
 1963: The Quick and the Dead as Parker
 1963: Spencer's Mountain as Spencer Brother (uncredited)
 1964: Robin and the 7 Hoods as Workman (uncredited)
 1964: Kisses for My President as Tour Guide (uncredited)
 1965: Willy McBean and his Magic Machine as Professor Von Rotten (voice)
 1965: Harlow as Editor (uncredited)
 1966: The Singing Nun as Mr. Duvries
 1966: The Russians Are Coming, the Russians Are Coming as Man with Cat (uncredited)
 1966: The Daydreamer 
 1966: The Appaloosa as Priest
 1966: Dead Heat on a Merry-Go-Round as Officer Howard
 1966: The Swinger as John Mallory
 1967: A Covenant with Death as Chillingworth
 1967: Caprice as Inspector Kapinsky
 1967: Rough Night in Jericho as Purley (uncredited)
 1967: The Perils of Pauline as Prince Benji's Father (uncredited)
 1967: In the Heat of the Night as Watkins
 1968: The Wicked Dreams of Paula Schultz as Grossmeyer
 1968: Bullitt (voice, uncredited)
 1969: Angel in My Pocket as Bishop Morenschild
 1970: The Liberation of L.B. Jones as Grocer
 1970: There Was a Crooked Man... as Harry
 1970: The Wild Country as The Marshal (uncredited)
 1971: Scandalous John as Bartender
 1972: Get to Know Your Rabbit as Mr. Seager
 1973: Kloot's Kounty as Crazywolf (voice)
 1973: Pay Your Buffalo Bill as Crazywolf / Big Red (voice)
 1973: Ten Miles to Gallop as Crazywolf (voice) 
 1973: Charley and the Angel as Felix
 1973: Oklahoma Crude as Deke Watson
 1973: The Sting as Train Conductor
 1973: Treasure Island as Doctor Livesey (voice)
 1973: Cotter 
 1974: Gold Struck (voice)
 1974: The Badge and the Beautiful as Townspeople / Bartender / Priest / Lauri Be (voice) 
 1974: By Hoot or By Brook as The Fox / Coach Driver / Guard (voice)
 1974: Big Beef at the O.K. Corral as Billy the Kidder (voice)
 1974: Saddle Soap Opera as Judge Soy Bean / Hotel Clerk (voice)
 1974: Mesa Trouble as Townspeople (voice)
 1974: Black Eye as Reverend Avery
 1974: Oliver Twist (voice)
 1976: Death Riders
 1976: Pony Express Rider as Blackmore
 1980: The Octagon as Tibor
 1980: A Snow White Christmas as Mirror (voice)

Animated shorts 
 1969–1972: Tijuana Toads, as Crazylegs Crane (voice)
 1972–1974: The Blue Racer, as Blue Racer (voice)

Television series 
 1954: Ad and Lib
 1954–1959: Howdy Doody
 1957–1958: Last of the Mohicans
 1956–1957: The Barris Beat
 1958–1959: The Adventures of Chich
 1958–1959: Here's Duffy
 1961: Tales of the Wizard of Oz, voice of Rusty the Tin Man and The Wicked Witch of the West
 1961: The New Adventures of Pinocchio as Foxy Q. Fibble (voice)
 1965–1969: Bewitched in several guest appearances
 1965: The Big Valley guest appearance as Jake Kyles in "The Murdered Party"
 1966: My Favourite Martian, guest appearance as Butterball (Season 3, Episode 22)
 1966: Get Smart, guest appearance as Victor Slade
 1966: Shane, guest appearance as Harve Hanes  
 1966: Hogan's Heroes, guest appearance as Dr. Vanetti
 1966: The Iron Horse, guest appearance as Kellam in "A Dozen Ways to Kill a Man"
 1966–1967: The Man From U.N.C.L.E. in several guest roles
 1967: Rango as Purcell in "Requiem for a Ranger"
 1967: Hogan's Heroes, guest appearance as SS General Brenner 
 1967–1968: Accidental Family as Marty Warren in 11 episodes   
 1967: The Green Hornet as Dr. Eric Mabouse in "Invasion from Outer Space: Parts 1 & 2"
 1967: Dragnet 1967 as Pete Benson
 1967: I Spy: guest appearance as Arbuckle in "Night Train to Madrid"  
 1967–1973: Gunsmoke in several guest roles
 1968: The Guns of Will Sonnett  guest appearance as Mort Lucas in "Guilt"
 1968: Mannix guest appearance as Orlando Quinn in "To Kill a Writer"
 1968: It Takes a Thief guest appearance as Dedier in "The Lay of the Land"
 1969: It Takes a Thief guest appearance as Achille Morales in "The Baranoff Timetable"
 1969: Hogan's Heroes, guest appearance as Igor Illyich Zagoskin 
 1970–1971: Green Acres in several guest roles including crooked real estate con-man Lawrence David in the final episode.   
 1970: Sabrina and the Groovy Ghoulies
 1971: Bonanza guest appearance as Alex Steiner in "An Earthquake Called Callahan" 
 1972: Mod Squad guest appearance as Harry Burns in "Can You Hear Me Out There?"
 1971–1974: Dr. Simon Locke'Police Surgeon 1976: The Pink Panther Laugh and a Half Hour and a Half Show (voice)
 1976–1985: Walt Disney's Wonderful World of Color in several guest roles
 1978: Quincy, M.E. as Dr. Jones in "Ashes to Ashes"
 1978: How the West Was Won guest appearances as Mr. Pennington
 1978: Fangface (voice)
 1979: The Plastic Man Comedy/Adventure Show (voice)
 1981: Dukes of Hazzard as Boss J.W. Hickman
 1981–1987: Hill Street Blues, as Judge Lee Oberman
 1983: The All-New Scooby and Scrappy-Doo Show (voice)
 1990: MacGyver guest appearance as Capt. Ion Cuzo in "Humanity"
 1989: The Pink Panther and Friends (voice)
 1985: MacGyver guest appearance as Daniel Sims in "The Heist"

 Television films and specials 
 1964: Rudolph the Red Nosed Reindeer, voice of Yukon Cornelius
 1964: Return to Oz, voice of Rusty Tinman and The Wicked Witch of the West
 1971: Dead Men Tell No Tales 1971: Do Not Fold, Spindle, or Mutilate 1977: Columbo: Murder Under Glass 1979: The New Misadventures of Ichabod Crane, voice of Rip Van Winkle
 1980: A Snow White Christmas (voice)
 1981: Dennis the Menace in Mayday for Mother (TV), voice of Mr. Wilson
 1991: Love, Lies and Murder'' (TV)

ReferencesNotes'

External links
 Larry D. Mann profile on northernstars.ca
 
 Find a Grave

1922 births
2014 deaths
Canadian male film actors
Canadian male television actors
Canadian male voice actors
Male actors from Toronto
Jewish Canadian male actors
Canadian expatriate male actors in the United States
Burials at Eden Memorial Park Cemetery